The 2015 CPISRA World Games were held in Nottingham, England from 6 to 16 August 2015.

Sports

 Athletics including Racerunning
 Bowls
 CP Football
 Para Taekwondo
 Swimming
 Table cricket

Venues
The venues to be used for the World Championships were located in Nottingham.

Participating delegations 

  Australia
  Austria
  Brazil
  Denmark
  England
  Hungary
  Ireland
  Japan
  Netherlands
  Portugal
  Russia
  Sweden
  Scotland

Competition

Athletics

Bowls
Competition Format
 Singles: World Bowls Tour qualification format. E.g. best of 2 sets (each set consisting of 7 ends) with a 3 end tie breaker if needed. 90 mins per match.
 Doubles: Pairs will be drawn at random to play against each other in a basic round robin format.

Results

Bowls Pairs

Bowls Singles

Spirit of the Games Award

 John Wardrope

Football

Para Taekwondo
 no information about the competition

Swimming

Table cricket
 test match (no other information)

Medal table

See also

 CP football

References

External links
 CPISRA World Games Nottingham 2015
 CPISRA World Games 2015 Results Final (pdf)
 Cerebral Palsy International Sports & Recreation Association (CPISRA)
 International Federation of Cerebral Palsy Football (IFCPF)

World Games
International sports competitions hosted by England
2015 in English sport
August 2015 sports events in the United Kingdom